The Orchard Hill Observatory is an astronomical observatory located at the highest point on the University of Massachusetts Amherst campus. Constructed in 1965, the observatory is a red brick building with a 16-inch Cassegrain reflector optical telescope. It is used for several community events and is regularly open for public viewing on Thursday nights. Originally the observatory was home to a 20" telescope, given to the department by an avid amateur who lived in central Massachusetts. It was a  scale model (loosely) of a larger 200" scope. Eventually, a crack was spotted  during one of the re-aluminizings of the 20" mirror and the scope was no more. In the meantime, the department had been granted money associated with its move from Hasbrouck to the Grad Research Tower to buy a small telescope and put in on top of the GRC. The GRC had a small "isolation" pad built on its roof, which was supposed to be a mount for the scope, which could be accessed via a small open elevator. However, the GRC had terrible noise and gross vibration problems. The isolation pad never worked and there were too many safety concerns about using the roof of the building for observing. A 16" telescope was later bought from Competition Associates (a racing car company).  That scope arrived in 1976 but because of the problems with using the top of the GRC, the scope was never mounted there.  In fact, it sat in the basement of Hasbrouck for perhaps 10 years, becoming known as the "Subterranean Telescope". This situation finally led to the 20" being disassembled and the 16" scope being moved to Orchard Hill and installed in the dome there.  The 16" was a major improvement in usability. As to what happened to the 20", the mirror may have been stored in the Astronomy Research Facility but the drive was most likely not kept.

Special thanks to Professor Thomas Arny for much of the recent history of the facility.

Hours

The observatory does not have a regular schedule.

Administration 

It is maintained and operated by the UMass Astronomy Department. The observatory is supported by members of the Five College Astronomy Club. The observatory does not receive any external funding. The program is student-run, except for one faculty member. It is a part of the College of Natural Sciences/Astronomy.

Observations
It is possible to see a variety of astronomical (not astrological as previously given) bodies at the observatory. Members of the observatory keep a log online of what they have observed. Some things that have been logged are the double star Albireo, the great nebula in Andromeda, a dense patch of stars in the milky way near Cygnus, Jupiter with Galilean moons, the waxing gibbous Moon, Mars, and Alcor & Mizar.

Five College Astronomy Club
The Five College Astronomy Club is a club for those interested in astronomy, regardless of major. The club utilizes the Orchard Hill Observatory to host observing nights on clear Wednesday and Thursday nights. The club also travels to other observatories, planetariums, and other sites of interest related to astronomy. The club spans between the Five Colleges (UMass Amherst, Amherst College, Hampshire College, Smith College, and Mount Holyoke College) to further their experiences and connect with other students who share their interest in astronomy. The club sometimes hosts informational sessions geared towards students looking to propel into research positions or achieve specific academic goals within the astronomy major. However, the main objective of the club is to have fun and meet other people with a shared interest in astronomy.

 Meets: Thursday Nights at 7:00 p.m., usually in LGRT 1033 OR clear Wednesday and Thursday nights at dusk at the Orchard Hill Observatory
 Chartered: Fall 2011

Five College Astronomy Department

The Five College Astronomy Department is a collaborative program of Amherst College, Hampshire College, Mount Holyoke College, Smith College, and the University of Massachusetts, which are all located in the Connecticut River valley of western Massachusetts.

See also
 List of astronomical observatories
 List of radio telescopes

References

External links
 Orchard Hill Observatory Homepage

Astronomical observatories in Massachusetts
Buildings and structures in Hampshire County, Massachusetts
University of Massachusetts Amherst buildings